Yeşilsırt is a village in the Dicle District of Diyarbakır Province in Turkey.

References

Villages in Dicle District